Borrelia kurtenbachii is a spirochete bacterium; it can be pathogenic, being involved in cases of Lyme borreliosis.

See also
Lyme disease microbiology

References

Further reading

External links 
NCBI Taxonomy Browser - Borrelia

kurtenbachii
Bacteria described in 2011